Akanksha Juneja is an Indian television actress best known for playing Kanak Desai in Saath Nibhaana Saathiya 2.

Filmography

Television

Films

References

External links

Living people
Actresses in Hindi television
Actresses from Delhi
Indian television actresses
Indian soap opera actresses
1990 births
21st-century Indian actresses